Glamorgan County Cricket Club was officially founded on 6 July 1888. Glamorgan's team was elevated to first-class status in May 1921 when the club joined the County Championship. It is one of eighteen county teams in England and Wales that play first-class cricket. The player appointed club captain leads the team in all fixtures except if unavailable.

 Norman Riches (1921, 1929)
 Tom Whittington (1922–1923)
 Johnnie Clay (1924–1927, 1929, 1946)
 Trevor Arnott (1928)
 Maurice Turnbull (1930–1939)
 Wilf Wooller (1947–1960)
 Ossie Wheatley (1961–1966)
 Tony Lewis (1967–1972)
 Majid Khan (1973–1976)
 Alan Jones (1974, 1976–1978)
 Robin Hobbs (1979)
 Malcolm Nash (1980–1981)
 Javed Miandad (1982)
 Barry Lloyd (1982)
 Mike Selvey (1983–1984)
 Rodney Ontong (1984–1986)
 Hugh Morris (1986–1989, 1993–1995)
 Alan Butcher (1989–1992)
 Matthew Maynard (1992, 1996–2000)
 Steve James (2001–2003)
 Robert Croft (2003–2006)
 David Hemp (2006–2008)
 Jamie Dalrymple (2009–2010)
 Alviro Petersen (2011)
 Mark Wallace (2012–2013)
 Jacques Rudolph (2014-2017)
 Michael Hogan (2017-2018)
 Chris Cooke (2019 - 2021)
 David Lloyd (2021 to date)

See also
 List of Glamorgan CCC players

Notes

cricket
Glamorgan
Captains
Glam